Jean-Jacques-Marie Huvé (28 April 1783, Versailles – 23 November 1852, Paris) was a French architect who practiced in Paris, working in a neoclassical manner that he refined working in the atelier of Percier and Fontaine, Napoleon's chief architects.

Biography
He was the son of the architect, Jean-Jacques Huvé, from whom he received his earliest instruction. He was named supervisor of the works at the Église de la Madeleine in 1808, and at the decease of its architect, in 1828, he was called upon to bring the work to completion. His tenacity finally pressed the government to release the funding that permitted the church to be completed in 1842.

He was appointed architect of the Royal Mails, was admitted a member of the Académie des Beaux-Arts (the Institut de France's architecture, music, and fine arts section) and served as president of the Société des Beaux-Arts.

As a teacher, he trained renowned architect Eugène Viollet-le-Duc in his studio.

His only son, Félix Huvé (1816-1887), was Mayor of Sablé-sur-Sarthe.

Principal works
 Église de la Madeleine, Paris, which he finished 1828-42 
 Château de Saint-Ouen, built on behalf of Louis XVIII for Zoé Talon, comtesse du Cayla, 1821-1822.
 Château de Compiègne
 Salle Ventadour, 1826–1829

Sources
 Bruno Centorame (Ed.), Autour de la Madeleine: art, littérature et société, Paris, AAVP, 2005. 
 Louis Hautecoeur, Histoire de l'architecture classique en France, Paris, Picard, 1943-1957.
 François Loyer, Histoire de l'architecture française. T. 3, De la Révolution à nos jours, Paris, Mengès-CNMHS, 1999.

External links

1783 births
1852 deaths
People from Versailles
19th-century French architects
Burials at Père Lachaise Cemetery
Members of the Académie des beaux-arts